The University of Nottingham is a public research university in Nottingham, United Kingdom. It was founded as University College Nottingham in 1881, and was granted a royal charter in 1948. The University of Nottingham belongs to the research intensive Russell Group association.

Nottingham's main campus (University Park) with Jubilee Campus and teaching hospital (Queen's Medical Centre) are located within the City of Nottingham, with a number of smaller campuses and sites elsewhere in Nottinghamshire and Derbyshire. Outside the UK, the university has campuses in Semenyih, Malaysia, and Ningbo, China. Nottingham is organised into five constituent faculties, within which there are more than 50 schools, departments, institutes and research centres. Nottingham has more than 46,000 students and 7,000 staff across the UK, China and Malaysia and had an income of £792.2 million in 2021–22, of which £131.4 million was from research grants and contracts. The institution's alumni have been awarded 3 Nobel Prizes, a Fields Medal, a Turner Prize, and a Gabor Medal and Prize. The university is a member of the Association of Commonwealth Universities, the European University Association, the Russell Group, Universitas 21, Universities UK, the Virgo Consortium, and participates in the Sutton Trust Summer School programme as a member of the Sutton 30.

History

Founding

The University of Nottingham traces its origins to both the founding of an adult education school in 1798, and the University Extension Lectures inaugurated by the University of Cambridge in 1873—the first of their kind in the country. However, the foundation of the university is generally regarded as being the establishment of University College Nottingham, in 1881 as a college preparing students for examinations of the University of London.

In 1875, an anonymous donor provided £10,000 to establish the work of the Adult Education School and Cambridge Extension Lectures on a permanent basis, and the Corporation of Nottingham agreed to erect and maintain a building for this purpose and to provide funds to supply the instruction.

The foundation stone of the college was duly laid in 1877 by the former Prime Minister William Ewart Gladstone, and the college's neo-gothic building on Shakespeare Street was formally opened in 1881 by Prince Leopold, Duke of Albany. In 1881, there were four professors – of Literature, Physics, Chemistry and Natural Science. New departments and chairs quickly followed: Engineering in 1884, Classics combined with Philosophy in 1893, French in 1897 and Education in 1905; in 1905 the combined Department of Physics and Mathematics became two separate entities; in 1911 Departments of English and Mining were created, in 1912, Economics, and Geology combined with Geography; History in 1914, Adult Education in 1923 and Pharmacy in 1925.

Development

The university college underwent significant expansion in the 1920s, when it moved from the centre of Nottingham to a large campus on the city's outskirts. The new campus, called University Park, was completed in 1928, and financed by an endowment fund, public contributions, and the generosity of Sir Jesse Boot (later Lord Trent) who presented  to the City of Nottingham in 1921. Boot and his fellow benefactors sought to establish an "elite seat of learning" committed to widening participation, and hoped that the move would solve the problems facing University College Nottingham, in its restricted building on Shakespeare Street. Boot stipulated that, whilst part of the Highfields site, lying south-west of the city, should be devoted to the University College, the rest should provide a place of recreation for the residents of the city, and, by the end of the decade, the landscaping of the lake and public park adjoining University Boulevard was completed. The original University College building on Shakespeare Street in central Nottingham, known as the Arkwright Building, now forms part of Nottingham Trent University's City Campus.

D. H. Lawrence commented on the endowment and the architecture in the wordsIn Nottingham, that dismal town where I went to school and college,they've built a new university for a new dispensation of knowledge.Built it most grand and cakeily out of the noble lootderived from shrewd cash-chemistry by good Sir Jesse Boot.

University College Nottingham was initially accommodated within the Trent Building, an imposing white limestone structure with a distinctive clock tower, designed by Morley Horder, and formally opened by King George V on 10 July 1928. During this period of development, Nottingham attracted high-profile lecturers, including Albert Einstein, H. G. Wells, and Mahatma Gandhi. The blackboard used by Einstein during his time at Nottingham is still on display in the Physics department.

Apart from its physical transfer to surroundings that could not be more different from its original home, the college made few developments between the wars. The Department of Slavonic Languages (later Slavonic Studies) was established in 1933, the teaching of Russian having been introduced in 1916. In 1933–34, the Departments of Electrical Engineering, Zoology and Geography, which had been combined with other subjects, were made independent; and in 1938 a supplemental Charter provided for a much wider representation on the Governing Body. However, further advances were delayed by the outbreak of war in 1939.

University status
University College Nottingham students received their degrees from the University of London. However, in 1943, the university was granted its Royal Charter which endowed it with university status and gave it the power to confer degrees. In 1948 University College Nottingham was incorporated as The University of Nottingham.

In the 1940s, the Midlands Agricultural and Dairy College at Sutton Bonington merged with the university as the School of Agriculture, and in 1956 the Portland Building was completed to complement the Trent Building. In 1970, the university established the UK's first new medical school of the 20th century.

In 1999, Jubilee Campus was opened on the former site of the Raleigh Bicycle Company, one mile (1.6 km) away from the University Park Campus. Nottingham then began to expand overseas, opening campuses in Malaysia and in China in 1999 and 2004 respectively. In 2005, the King's Meadow Campus opened near University Park.

The university has used several logos throughout its history, beginning with its coat of arms. Later, Nottingham adopted a simpler logo, in which a stylised version of Nottingham Castle was surrounded by the text "The University of Nottingham". In 2001 Nottingham undertook a major re-branding exercise, which included replacing the logo with the current one.

Campuses

UK campuses

University Park Campus 

University Park Campus, to the west of Nottingham city centre, is the  main campus of the University of Nottingham. Set around its lake and clock-tower and with extensive parkland greenery, University Park has won numerous awards for its architecture and landscaping, and has been named the greenest campus in the country in a Green Flag Award.

At the south entrance to the main campus, in Highfields Park, lies the Lakeside Arts Centre, the university's public arts facility and performance space. The D.H. Lawrence Pavilion houses a range of cultural facilities, including a 225 capacity theatre space, a series of craft cabinets, the Weston Gallery (which displays the university's manuscript collection), the Wallner gallery, which exists as a platform for local and regional artists, and a series of visual arts, performance and hospitality spaces. Other nearby facilities include the Djanogly Art Gallery, recital hall, and theatre, which in the past have hosted recordings and broadcasting by BBC Radio 3, the NOTT Dance and NOW festivals, and a series of contemporary art exhibitions.

Jubilee Campus 
The campus' facilities house the Schools of Education and Computer Science, and The Nottingham University Business School. The site is also the home of The National College for School Leadership. Additional investment of £9.2 million in Jubilee Campus was completed in 2004, with a second building for Nottingham University Business School opened by Lord Sainsbury. The environmentally friendly nature of the campus and its buildings have been a factor in the awards that it has received, including the Millennium Marque Award for Environmental Excellence, the British Construction Industry Building Project of the Year, the RIBA Journal Sustainability Award, and the Civic Trust Award for Sustainability.

The Jubilee Campus won the commendation of the Energy Globe Award judges in 2005. The campus is distinct for its modern and unique architecture, culminating in Aspire, a 60-metre tall artistic structure is the tallest freestanding structure in the UK. The university plans to invest £200 million in a new scheme designed by Ken Shuttleworth, designer of the London 'Gherkin' and founder of Make Architects. However, the architecture of the Jubilee Campus is not admired by all, and the newly completed Amenities Building and YANG Fujia Building have been labelled the second worst new architectural design in Britain in a recent survey.

A fire in September 2014 destroyed the GlaxoSmithKline building which was under construction, but it was rebuilt and officially opened in 2017.

Other campuses 
The City Hospital Campus houses staff and postgraduate students specialising in respiratory medicine, stroke medicine, oncology, physiotherapy, and public health. The campus was expanded in 2009 to house a new institute of public health and a specialist centre for tobacco research.

The campus is centred on the historic manor of Sutton Bonington and retains many of its own botanic gardens and lakes. The University Farm, including the Dairy Centre, is at the Sutton Bonington Campus.

King's Meadow Campus was established in 2005 on the former Central Independent Television Studios site on Lenton Lane. It mainly accommodates administrative functions, but also the Department of Manuscripts and Special Collections. A functioning television studio remains at the site, that continues to be rented to the film and television industry.

Castle Meadow Campus is a 3.75-hectare site below Nottingham Castle, purchased by the university in 2021, having been previously owned by HMRC (HM Revenue and Customs). Existing buildings are to be refurbished with the campus planned to open from 2023

International campuses

Nottingham has introduced overseas campuses as part of a growth strategy. The first stage in this strategy was the establishment in 1999 of a campus in Semenyih, Selangor, Malaysia, a short distance from Kuala Lumpur. This was followed in 2004 by a campus in Ningbo, Zhejiang Province, China.

The Malaysia campus was the first campus of a British university in Malaysia and one of the first anywhere in the world, earning the Queen's Award for Enterprise 2001 and the Queen's Award for Industry (International Trade) 2006.

The £40 million Ningbo campus was completed in 2005, and was officially opened by John Prescott, the UK's Deputy Prime Minister, in February 2006. Like the Malaysia Campus, Ningbo Campus builds on the University Park in the UK and includes a lake, its own version of Nottingham's famous Trent Building, and the Centre for Sustainable Energy Technologies (CSET), China's first zero-carbon building.

In November 2012, the university launched a new joint venture in collaboration with the East China University of Science and Technology: the Shanghai Nottingham Advanced Academy (SNAA). The SNAA will deliver joint courses in Shanghai including periods of study in Nottingham, with teaching and research at undergraduate, postgraduate, and doctoral levels.

Organisation

Faculties and departments
The university is made up of a number of schools and departments organised into five faculties: Arts, Engineering, Medicine and Health Sciences, Science, and Social Science. Each faculty encompasses a number of schools and departments.

Faculty of Arts
 American and Canadian Studies
 Classics and Archaeology
 Culture, Film and Media
 Cultures, Languages and Area Studies
 English
 French and Francophone Studies
 German Studies
 History
 History of Art
 Humanities
 Language Centre
 Music
 Philosophy
 Russian and Slavonic Studies
 Spanish, Portuguese and Latin American Studies
 Theology and Religious Studies

Faculty of Engineering 
 Architecture and Built Environment
 Chemical and Environmental Engineering 
 Civil Engineering 
 Foundation Engineering and Physical Sciences
 Electrical and Electronic Engineering 
 Mechanical, Materials and Manufacturing Engineering

Faculty of Medicine and Health Sciences 
 Health Sciences 
 Life Sciences 
 Medicine
 Veterinary Medicine and Science

Faculty of Science
 Biosciences 
 Plant Science
 Chemistry 
 Computer Science 
 Mathematical Sciences 
 Pharmacy
 Physics and Astronomy 
 Psychology

Faculty of Social Sciences
 Economics 
 Education
 Geography 
 Law 
 Nottingham University Business School
 Politics and International Relations
 Sociology and Social Policy

Governance
The chief officer is the Chancellor, elected by the University Court on the recommendation of the University Council. The chief academic and administrative officer is the Vice-Chancellor, who is assisted by Pro-Vice-Chancellors. The governing body is the University Council, which has 35 members and is mostly non-academic. The academic authority is the Senate, consisting of senior academics and elected staff and student representatives. The largest forum is the University Court, presided over by the Chancellor.

The office of Chancellor is currently vacant, following the retirement of Sir Andrew Witty. Witty, who became incumbent on 1 January 2013, announced his retirement in November 2017, and the role has been vacant since. He succeeded Yang Fujia, who had been installed in July 2001.

The current Registrar is Paul Greatrix.

Vice-Chancellors
The following have served as Vice-Chancellor of the university:

 1948–1965: Bertrand Hallward
 1965–1970: Frederick Dainton
 1971–1975: John Butterfield
 1976–1988: Basil Weedon
 1988–2008: Sir Colin Campbell
 2008–2017: Sir David Greenaway
 2017–present: Shearer West

Academic profile

Academics
Nottingham is a research-led institution, and two academics connected with the university were awarded Nobel Prizes in 2003. Clive Granger was jointly awarded the Nobel Prize in Economics. Much of the work on Magnetic Resonance Imaging (MRI) was carried out at Nottingham, work for which Sir Peter Mansfield received the Nobel Prize for Medicine in 2003. Nottingham remains a strong centre for research into MRI. The university has contributed to a number of other significant scientific advances. Frederick Kipping, Professor of Chemistry (1897–1936), made the discovery of silicone polymers at Nottingham. Major developments in the in vitro culture of plants and micropropogation techniques were made by plant scientists at Nottingham, along with the first production of transgenic tomatoes by Don Grierson in the 1980s. Other innovations at the university include cochlear implants for deaf children and the brace-for-impact position used in aircraft. In 2015, the Assemble collective, of which the part-time Architecture Department tutor Joseph Halligan is a member, won the Turner Prize, Europe's most prestigious art award. Other facilities at Nottingham include a 46 teraflop supercomputer.

Nottingham was ranked joint 23rd in the UK amongst multi-faculty institutions for the quality (GPA) of its research and 8th for its Research Power in the 2014 Research Excellence Framework. More than 80 per cent of research at the university was described as "world-leading" or "internationally excellent" in the UK Funding Councils' 2014 Research Excellence Framework, with 28 out of 32 returns having at least 75 per cent of impact that was either "outstanding" or "very considerable" – ranking the university 7th in the UK on this measure. Nottingham is also in the top seven universities in Britain for the amount of research income received, being awarded over £40 million in research contracts for the 2015–2016 academic year by UK Research Councils, and £159 million in total research awards income.

The university is home to the Leverhume Centre for Research on Globalisation and Economic Policy (GEP). GEP was established in the Nottingham School of Economics in 2001, and conducts research activities structured on the theme of globalisation.

Admissions

According to the latest statistics compiled by the Higher Education Statistics Agency, Nottingham is the UK's  largest university based on total student enrolment with  students; from more than 130 countries. 20% of Nottingham's undergraduates are privately educated, the 17th highest proportion among mainstream British universities. In the 2016–17 academic year, the university had a domicile breakdown of 78:5:17 of UK:EU:non-EU students respectively with a female to male ratio of 55:45.

The university gives offers of admission to 78.5% of its applicants, the joint 15th lowest amongst the Russell Group. According to The Times and The Sunday Times League Table 2015, the university received 7.3 applications for every place available, placing it joint 14th in the UK (tied with Edinburgh Napier University) for the 'Most Competition for Places'. For the 2013–14 admissions cycle, the average successful applicant attained 426 UCAS points (the equivalent of ABB at A Level and BB at AS Level), ranking it as the 22nd highest amongst higher educational institutes.

Rankings and reputation

The university was named Times Higher Education "University of the Year" in 2006, Times Higher Education "Entrepreneurial University of the Year" in 2008, and finished runner up in the 2010 Sunday Times "University of the Year". In 2016–17, Nottingham was named 'University of the Year' for graduate employment by The Sunday Times. Nottingham is described by the Fulbright Commission as "one of the UK's oldest, largest, and most prestigious universities". In 2019, it ranked 126th among the universities around the world by SCImago Institutions Rankings.

In the 2021 Research Excellence Framework (REF), which assesses the quality of research in UK higher education institutions, Nottingham is ranked joint 25th by GPA and 7th for research power (the grade point average score of a university, multiplied by the full-time equivalent number of researchers submitted). The 2016 CWUR University Ranking placed Nottingham University 139th globally and 10th nationally.

Nottingham is ranked 2nd in the UK (after Oxford) and 13th in the world in terms of the number of alumni listed among CEOs of the 500 largest companies worldwide. The 2015 Global Employability University Ranking places Nottingham 78th in the world and 11th in the UK. In 2017, Nottingham was ranked Europe's 71st 'Most Innovative University'.

More recently in the 2019 Complete University Guide national rankings, Nottingham placed 1st for Agriculture & Forestry, 2nd for Pharmacology & Pharmacy, 3rd for Social Work and Veterinary Medicine and 4th for American Studies and Physiotherapy. 19 subjects were ranked in the top ten.

Student life

Students' Union

The University of Nottingham Students' Union is heavily involved with providing student activities at the university and has more than 190 student societies affiliated to it. A further 76 clubs are affiliated to the Students' Union's Sports Committee. Nottingham participates yearly in the Varsity Series, a number of sporting events between the students and staff of the university and traditional rivals Nottingham Trent University.

The student newspaper Impact is published regularly during term time. The Students' Union radio station is University Radio Nottingham. A range of student theatre takes place at The New Theatre. The Students' Union also operates a student-run professional sound and lighting company, TEC PA & Lighting, who provide services for many events such as graduation, balls, and many other events, both within the university and to external clients.

The Students' Union also organises a number of activities and events involving students and staff with the local community. The Student Volunteer Centre sees more than 4500 students each year volunteering in local schools and community organisations, as well as a range of other projects throughout the city of Nottingham. The Union has the largest student-run RAG organisation outside of the US, "Karnival" (abbreviated to "Karni"), which raised £1.61 million in 2012. The Students' Union also runs an international volunteering project, InterVol, which sends student volunteers to work in rural African communities.

Karnival also ran "RAG raids" a format of charity fundraising in other cities, which proved to be one of the most profitable charity sources for the university with notably a single RAG raid in 2014 raising £66,552.72 for the Poppy Appeal. However, in April 2017 the raids were controversially banned by the students' union over the fears for the safety on students.

Halls of residence

The University of Nottingham has a system of halls located on its campus. The halls are generally named either after counties, districts, or places in the East Midlands or significant people associated with the university.

Controversies

'Nottingham Two'

On 14 May 2008, Hicham Yezza, a member of staff, and Rizwaan Sabir, a postgraduate student, were arrested at the University of Nottingham and were detained for six days under the Terrorism Act 2000. The university informed the police after finding an edited version of the al-Qaeda training manual the student was using for his research. Both were released without charge from terrorism offences. In September 2011, Rizwaan Sabir was awarded £20,000 compensation for false imprisonment by Nottinghamshire Police.

The university came under criticism after the only professor involved in terrorism studies at the institution, Rod Thornton, decided that, because of the university's lack of guidance to him regarding their position over possession of terrorist publications, he was no longer willing to risk possible arrest by teaching terrorism studies at the university, although he would continue in his other responsibilities. As a result, terrorism studies are no longer being taught at the University of Nottingham.

For a 2011 conference of the British International Studies Association, Thornton prepared a paper which alleged the university had engaged in systematic persecution against Yezza, Sabir, and junior academics in the department. One of Thornton's colleagues at Nottingham complained to BISA about alleged defamatory content of Thornton's paper, and a spokesman for the university called it "highly defamatory of a number of his colleagues". The paper was later removed from BISA's website.

In early May 2011, Thornton was suspended by the university for the "breakdown in working relationships" caused by the paper. In an open letter published in The Guardian, 67 international researchers including Noam Chomsky asked for Thornton's reinstatement and an independent examination of the university's actions, saying that Thornton's paper "carefully details what appear to be examples of serious misconduct from senior university management over the arrest of two university members". 
In 2011, a campaign was launched calling for the reinstatement of Rod Thornton and for a public inquiry into the university's actions. In March 2012 it was announced that Thornton was leaving his job as a lecturer at Nottingham, and that, "for his part, Dr Thornton accepts that the article which he published on the BISA website in April 2011 contained a number of inaccuracies." Thornton apologized for any offence he might have caused.

COVID-19 pandemic response
In the 2020–21 academic year, students of the University of Nottingham organised large-scale campaigning against the university management team and specifically the Vice-Chancellor, Shearer West, for wider academic, welfare, and financial support for studentake, due to the on-going COVID-19 pandemic.

As of 4 February, the university administration initiated a safety net policy, for a variety of assignment types, in partial compliance with student demands. However demands for a wider university policy to support students with welfare support have yet to be made, with further complaints arising due to minimal financial support being provided to home students and additional issues arising for international students - resulting in a number of go-fund me pages being created to help international students pay their tuition.

Student campaigners are yet to comment on the development of this situation.

Attitudes towards Catholicism
At the start of the 2021–22 academic year, Patrick McKinney, Bishop of Nottingham, appointed Fr David Palmer to position of Catholic Chaplain to the university.  The university actively blocked his appointment on the basis of his views on abortion and euthanasia. This triggered mass international criticism, including from Ann Furedi, a former chief executive of the British Pregnancy Advisory Service with strongly pro-choice views, who described the decision as "stupid" and stated "I disagree with his views on abortion but as a Catholic priest he’s expressing a mainstream Catholic view. Universities can’t tell chaplains what religious beliefs to express".

Fr Palmer's criticism of abortion and euthanasia were entirely in line with the Catholic Church's teaching.

The university are yet to comment on the development of this situation or the media coverage which it has generated.

Notable people

The university has been associated with a range of notable alumni and staff in a number of disciplines:
Nobel prize or Fields medal winners; Sir Clive Granger – Nobel Prize in Economics, Sir Peter Mansfield – Nobel Prize in Physiology or Medicine for contributions to Magnetic Resonance Imaging, Andre Geim – Nobel Prize–winning physicist, and Caucher Birkar – Fields medal-winning mathematician.

Academics:

 Sir Arthur Elijah Trueman – geologist
 Milton Wainwright – microbiologist
 Sir Keith O'Nions – ex-president and rector of Imperial College London
 Jeremy Lawrance – professor of Spanish Golden Age studies
 Ivy Pinchbeck – economic and social historian of women
 Helen Willetts – meteorologist
 Sir Martyn Poliakoff – professor in chemistry and featured in Periodic Table of Videos
 Stewart Adams – contributor to the development of ibuprofen
 Sir Ian Kershaw – historian
 Sophie Harker – winner of IET's 2018 Young Women Engineer of the Year Award and the Sir Henry Royce Medal.
 Monica Partridge – first woman at Nottingham to be made a professor in 1967

Arts and media:
 Emma Barnett – journalist, presenter of BBC Newsnight and Woman's Hour
 Andrew Grima – British jewellery designer
 Graham Dury – cartoonist
 Haydn Gwynne – actress
 D.H. Lawrence – writer
 John Peel – writer
 Ruth Wilson – actress
 Theo James – actor
 Clive Tyldesley – football commentator

Business:

 David Ross – co-founder of The Carphone Warehouse
 Kweku Adoboli – UBS Rogue Trader of "the biggest fraud in British history"
 Jonathan Browning – former president and CEO of Volkswagen Group of America
 Steve Holliday – former CEO of National Grid plc
 Tim Martin – founder and chairman of J D Wetherspoon
 Simon Nixon – billionaire businessman, co-founder of Moneysupermarket.com, dropped out
 John Rishton – former CEO of Rolls-Royce plc
 Richard Scudamore – CEO of the Premier League
 Sir Andrew Witty – former CEO of GlaxoSmithKline
 John Timpson – Chairman of Timpson
 Tan Sir Francis Yeoh (Honorary Doctor of Laws) – Managing Director of YTL Corp Berhad Group
 Ruth Yeoh – executive director of YTL Singapore
 Peter Rice – president of 21st Century Fox

Politics and public service:

 Tedros Adhanom – Director General of the World Health Organization
 Jonathan Van-Tam – Deputy Chief Medical Officer for England
 Najib Razak – former Prime Minister of Malaysia
 Sir John Sawers – former head of MI6
 Paul Dibb – Australian strategist and former Director of the Joint Intelligence Organisation
 Judith Gough - ambassador
 Theresa Tam – Canada's Chief Public Health Officer
 Azlan Shah of Perak – 9th Yang di-Pertuan Agong of Malaysia (King of Malaysia)
 Jaafar of Negeri Sembilan – 10th Yang di-Pertuan Agong of Malaysia (King of Malaysia)
 Kemebradikumo Pondei – acting managing director of Niger Delta Development Commission
 Jeremy Browne – Minister of State for the Home Office
 Anthony Joseph Lloyd – Police and Crime Commissioner for Greater Manchester
 Mazen Sinokrot – Minister of Economy, Palestinian Territories
 Michael Dugher – former Shadow Secretary of State for Culture, Media and Sport
 Ahmad Tavakkoli – Iranian politician
 Divya Maderna – member of Legislative Assembly of Rajasthan
 Mikhail Svetov – Russian politician, one of the main ideologists and popularizers of libertarianism in Russia
Dennis Tan – LLB (1994), Member of Parliament (Worker's Party), Singapore

Legal:

 Sir John Cyril Smith – criminal lawyer
 Sir Nigel Sweeney – High Court judge
 Punch Coomaraswamy – Supreme Court Judge (Singapore) and Ambassador of Singapore to the United States

See also

 Academic dress of the University of Nottingham
 Armorial of UK universities
 China Policy Institute
 Institute of Contemporary Chinese Studies
 International Trade Awards (2007)
 List of modern universities in Europe (1801–1945)
 List of universities in the UK
 The George Green Institute for Electromagnetics Research

Notes and references

Bibliography

 Fawcett, Peter and Neil Jackson (1998). Campus critique: the architecture of the University of Nottingham. Nottingham: University of Nottingham.
 Tolley, B. H. (2001). The history of the University of Nottingham. Nottingham: Nottingham University Press.

 Derek Winterbottom, Bertrand Hallward: First Vice-Chancellor of the University of Nottingham, 1948-1965. A Biography (The University of Nottingham, Nottingham, 1995)

External links

 University of Nottingham website
 University of Nottingham Alumni Association
 Highfields and Nottingham University Parks – Information and pictures

 
University of Nottingham
Russell Group
1881 establishments in England
Educational institutions established in 1881
Universities UK